The Winnipeg Blue Bombers were once again permitted to challenge for the Grey Cup following a rule dispute a year earlier. In a meeting of the previous two Grey Cup champions, the Blue Bombers prevailed, sending the coveted mug west for the third time.

Canadian Football News in 1941
The Calgary Bronks left the WIFU and the Vancouver Grizzlies joined. The IRFU was renamed to Eastern Canada Union for one season.

The Hamilton Tigers did not participate in the Eastern Canada Union, due to World War II and the Toronto Balmy Beach Beachers of the ORFU joined. The Tigers would resume play in 1945.

Regular season

Final regular season standings
Note: GP = Games Played, W = Wins, L = Losses, T = Ties, PF = Points For, PA = Points Against, Pts = Points

Bold text means that they have clinched the playoffs.

Grey Cup playoffs
Note: All dates in 1941

League Finals

Winnipeg won the total-point series by 32–22. Winnipeg advances to the Grey Cup game.

Ottawa won the total-point series by 18–17. Ottawa will play the Hamilton Wildcats (ORFU Champions) in the Eastern Finals.

Eastern Finals

Ottawa advances to the Grey Cup game.

Playoff bracket

Grey Cup Championship
{| cellspacing="10"
| valign="top" |
{| class="wikitable"
! bgcolor="#DDDDDD" colspan="4" | November 29
29th Annual Grey Cup Game: Varsity Stadium – Toronto, Ontario
|-
! WIFU Champion !! IRFU Champion
|-
|| Winnipeg Blue Bombers 18 || Ottawa Rough Riders 16
|-
| align="center" colspan="4" | The Winnipeg Blue Bombers are the 1941 Grey Cup Champions
|-
|}
|}

1941 All Eastern Rugby Football Union All-StarsNOTE: During this time most players played both ways, so the All-Star selections do not distinguish between some offensive and defensive positions.QB – Bill Stukus, Toronto Argonauts
HB – Stan O'Neil, Ottawa Rough Riders
HB – Bobby Coulter, Toronto Argonauts
DHB - Tony Golab, Ottawa Rough Riders
FW – Sammy Sward, Toronto Balmy Beach Beachers
E  – Jack Wedley, Toronto Argonauts
E  – Tony McCarthy, Ottawa Rough Riders
C  – Curly Moynahan, Ottawa Rough Riders
G – George Fraser, Ottawa Rough Riders
G – Len Staughton, Ottawa Rough Riders
T – Bob Cosgrove, Toronto Argonauts
T – Paul McGarry, Ottawa Rough Riders

1941 Western All-StarsNOTE: During this time most players played both ways, so the All-Star selections do not distinguish between some offensive and defensive positions.''
QB – Art Stevenson, Winnipeg Blue Bombers
FW – Ken Charlton, Regina Roughriders
HB – Fritz Hanson, Winnipeg Blue Bombers
HB – Jim Ladner, Winnipeg Blue Bombers
FB – Dan Capraru, Regina Roughriders
E  – Larry Haynes, Vancouver Grizzlies
E  – Ches McCance, Winnipeg Blue Bombers
C  – Mel Wilson, Winnipeg Blue Bombers
G – Maurice Williams, Regina Roughriders
G – Les Lear, Winnipeg Blue Bombers
T – Gord Gellhaye, Vancouver Grizzlies
T – Lou Mogul, Winnipeg Blue Bombers

1941 Canadian Football Awards
 Jeff Russel Memorial Trophy (IRFU MVP) – Tony Golab (RB), Ottawa Rough Riders
 Imperial Oil Trophy (ORFU MVP) - Al Lenard - Hamilton Wildcats

References

 
Canadian Football League seasons
Grey Cups hosted in Toronto